An ostiole is a small hole or opening through which algae or fungi release their mature spores. 

The word is a  diminutive of "ostium", "opening".

The term is also used in higher plants, for example to denote the opening of the involuted  syconium (fig inflorescence) through which fig wasps enter to pollinate and breed.

Sometimes a stomatal aperture is called an "ostiole".

See also
Ostium (disambiguation)

References

Fungal morphology and anatomy
Plant anatomy